The Great Southern and Western Railway Class 90 is a class of  steam locomotive.  They were one of the smallest steam locomotives to be inherited by the CIÉ on its formation.

History 
In 1875 Inchicore Works outshopped two railmotors, steam locomotives with a carriage on the same chassis to work the Castleisland and Gortatlea Light Railway. Both railmotors were rebuilt (the first in 1890) removing the carriage portion and leaving the locomotive as a small and light .  The two examples were numbered 90 and 100 and were put to work in the Cork area. Unusually, the centre driving wheels were flangeless giving very good working over tight radius tracks.   They regularly shunted along the quayside at Cork and worked the car trains from the Ford works to Rocksavage yard. In the summer months both locomotives were coupled together to work the excursion trains on the lightly laid Timoleague and Courtmacsherry Light Railway.

In 1890 the class was enlarged with Inchicore building two further examples for use on the Fermoy to Mitchelstown branch and two for the Kingsbridge to Inchicore branch, which they worked until 1945.
Several detail changes were made over the years.  One of the most noticeable was the replacement of the original chimney (which had a pronounced taper from base to apex), being replaced with a parallel version with a distinct lip.

Dimensions 

 Driving Wheels:  (10 spokes), centre wheels flangeless.
 Cylinders: (2)  
 Boiler Pressure: 
 Weight:

Livery 
As locomotives they were painted in dark green with red, black and light green (later black and white) lining, with numbers on buffer beams in yellow, shaded white and blue. The tank sides carried number plates with polished numbers against a paint black background on the plate. After about 1915 they became all-over plain grey, initially with numberplates painted on in grey, but latterly under CIÉ these were removed and large pale yellow painted numerals applied instead. No. 90, the last survivor, appears to have been repainted black in its last few years in use, approximately 1957-60.

Preservation 

 
One example, No. 90, was preserved for many years as a static exhibit at Mallow railway station. This was painted in the green livery, as detailed above, but a cast number plate with black numerals on a silver background (not original) has replaced the painted numbers. After a brief spell in the CIÉ workshops at Inchicore No. 90 was removed to the workshops of the Railway Preservation Society of Ireland at Whitehead in 2005, to undergo restoration. The locomotive was back in steam by Sunday 30 September 2007 and can now be seen on static display in the Carriage Gallery at the Downpatrick Railway Museum.

See also
 Diesel Locomotives of Ireland
 Multiple Units of Ireland
 Coaching Stock of Ireland
 Steam locomotives of Ireland

References

External links
 Number 90
 Downpatrick

0-6-0T locomotives
Steam locomotives of Ireland
Steam locomotives of Northern Ireland
Railway locomotives introduced in 1875
5 ft 3 in gauge locomotives